The Malakand Pass Peshawar with chitral is a mountain pass in Malakand District, Khyber Pakhtunkhwa, Pakistan.

The pass road begins at Dargai. The road across the pass is in good condition, but may often become crowded from a high volume of HGVs. From a viewpoint about one kilometre before the top of the pass, one can see the Swat Canal in the valley below. It was built by the British to channel water from the Swat River through a tunnel under the Malakand Pass to the plains around Mardan.

On the left, Malakand Fort guards the road at the top of the pass. On the other side of the pass, the road descends through the market town of Batkhela, with a Hindu Shahi fort perched above it, and continues past the headworks of the Swat Canal to the Swat River. The first bridge across the river is at Chakdara, which carries the road to Lower Dir and Chitral. There was a battle at the pass during the Chitral Expedition.
The fort was also the residence of Mughal prince Rafi-ush-Shan the son of emperor Bahadur Shah the First and grandson of Emperor Aurangzeb.

History
It came into prominence in 1895 during the Chitral Expedition, when 7000 Pashtuns held it against Sir Robert Low's advance, but were easily routed. After the campaign was over a fortified camp was formed on the Malakand to guard the road to Chitral. During the frontier risings of 1897 the Swatis made a determined attack on the Malakand, where 700 were killed, and on the adjacent post of Chakdara, where 2000 were killed. This was the origin of the Malakand Expedition of the same year.

See also
List of UNESCO World Heritage Sites in Pakistan
List of forts in Pakistan
List of museums in Pakistan

References

Malakand District
Mountain passes of Khyber Pakhtunkhwa